Survivor Croatia is a Croatian reality game show based on the international Survivor format. Following the premise of other versions of the Survivor format, the show features a group of contestants, referred to as "castaways" as they are marooned in an isolated location. The castaways must provide food, water, fire, and shelter for themselves. The contestants compete in various challenges for rewards and immunity from elimination. The contestants are progressively eliminated from the game as they are voted off the island by their fellow castaways, or eliminated through challenges. The final castaway remaining is awarded the title of "Sole Survivor" and the grand prize (700,000HRK in season 1, €50,000 in season 2).

The series first aired on HRT 2 in 2005 with the title Survivor: Odisejev otok. It was cancelled the same year. In 2012, the fourth season of Survivor Srbija was broadcast on the Croatian channel RTL Televizija and serves as the second Croatian season of Survivor. The third season, a pan-regional season, premiered March 14, 2022 on Nova TV in Croatia.

Format

Seasons 1 and 2 
The formats of the first two seasons differ from each other. The first season's format is similar to the early seasons of the American version, while the second season is similar to the original Robinson series.

The basic premise of both versions is that the players are split up into two tribes and marooned on an island for over a month where they have to provide food, water, fire and shelter for each other. Every few days, the tribes are to compete in a challenge either for a reward (usually food, drinks, comfort, or items that help with camp life), or for immunity. The tribe that wins immunity is safe from elimination and doesn't have to visit Tribal Council, a ceremony where a player is voted out of the tribe.

About halfway into the competition, the tribes are merged, and the challenges become individual. Usually only one person is eligible to win immunity or reward, although there is an occasional team challenge for reward. During this phase of the game, eliminated contestants join the jury. When it's time for the Final Tribal Council (which happens with as few as 2 or as many as 4 players), the contestants don't vote each other out. Instead, the jury listens to the players plead their case, ask questions, and based on the information they've received, cast their vote for the winner. The player with the most voted wins the game and a cash prize. In the first season, though there was a jury system, the public voted for a winner instead. The jurors were also given the right to abstain from voting.

Several twists have been in play as well. At the start of season one, there was a challenge where a player from both tribes was automatically eliminated if they lost. This was most likely inspired by a similar twist from Survivor: Palau, a season that had recently finished airing when Odisejev otok started. In the second season, "The Island of the Banished" was in play. Inspired by Redemption Island from previous versions of the series, The Island of the Banished is a separate island where a contestant is sent after they're voted out. They have to provide shelter, food, fire and water for themselves while they wait for another player to get voted out. When there are two players, they participate in a duel where the loser is sent to the jury (unless they break the rules, in which case they are ejected permanently). The cycle repeats until the merge, where the winner officially rejoins the game and the island is no longer in play. On the last day, the final 6 players competed in a challenge where the two losers were sent to the jury, and the final 4 moved onto the Final Tribal Council.

Season 3 
This season's format is based on the Turkish version.

20 castaways, 9 from Croatia, 8 from Serbia, 2 from Montenegro, and 1 from Bosnia and Herzegovina, are split up into two tribes based on nationality, with the Croats and Bosnian and one tribe and the Serbs and Montenegrins on the other. Challenges are held almost every day; 2 for Reward and 2 for Immunity. The tribe that wins Immunity does not have to nominate anyone for elimination. After one player from the losing tribe is nominated (or more should the vote end in a deadlock tie), another Immunity Challenge is held with the losing tribe having to nominate someone. Once two or more castaways are nominated, they are to participate in a Duel, with the loser going home. Should a player be pulled from the game for medical reasons, a replacement will join the game and be granted immunity from the first Tribal Council they attend. Additional castaways may also be added.

Survivor in Croatia
Influenced by the success of the Croatian version of Big Brother, HRT 2 launched a Croatian version of Survivor as well. The series featured 20 contestants. A second season was never made, possibly due to low ratings.

The fourth season of Survivor Srbija, the Serbian version of Survivor, serves as the second Croatian edition of Survivor. Alongside the usual host, Andrija Milošević, Croatian TV host Marijana Batinić hosted alongside him on-location. Croatian and Serbian hosts Antonija Blaće and Milan Kalinić also appeared on the show. In a first for Survivor Srbija, the series also featured contestants from Croatia and aired on RTL Televizija, a Croatian TV channel.

On October 14, 2021, United Group opened applications for a brand new pan-regional version of Survivor. It was filmed in the Dominican Republic. It consists of players from the ex-Yugoslav region. In Croatia, it aired on Nova TV. The airdate (March 14, 2022) was revealed on March 10, 2022.

Season list

Locations

List of contestants

See also 

Other versions
Serbian Survivor
Slovenian Survivor
Similar shows
 Big Brother Croatia
 The Farm Croatia

Notes

References

External links 
 Official website
 Nova TV webpage
 Official 2005 website archive
 2012 website archive

Croatia
2005 Croatian television series debuts
2005 Croatian television series endings
2012 Croatian television series debuts
2012 Croatian television series endings
Croatian Radiotelevision original programming